Syrovatka may refer to:

 Syrovátka, a village in the Czech Republic
 Syrovatka River, a river in Ukraine that runs near Krasnopillia, Sumy Oblast
 Syrovatka (Sumy Oblast), a village in Ukraine on Highway H12